Placocarpus is a genus of lichens in the family Verrucariaceae. The genus was circumscribed by Italian botanist Vittore Benedetto Antonio Trevisan de Saint-Léon in 1860.

References

Eurotiomycetes genera
Verrucariales
Lichen genera
Taxa described in 1860